Streets of Stalingrad is a 1979 board wargame published by Phoenix Games.

Gameplay
Streets of Stalingrad is a game that simulates the fighting from a company/platoon level that happened in the streets in late autumn 1942.

Reception
Nick Schuessler reviewed Streets of Stalingrad in The Space Gamer No. 28. Schuessler commented that "city fighting has never been done that well. SOS is no worse than previous efforts, and should get marks for a good try."

Streets of Stalingrad was awarded the Charles S. Roberts Award for "Best Initial Release of a Boardgame of 1980".

Reviews
Strategy & Tactics #80
 Casus Belli #4 (June 1981)

References

Board games introduced in 1979
Origins Award winners
World War II board wargames